Silver Lake is a privately owned brackish water pond in Milford, Delaware.  It is located by the headwaters of the Mispillion River. Haven Lake is adjacent to Silver Lake. U.S. Route 113 travels between the two lakes, crossing the Mispillion River. On the river, there was a milldam established in the late 18th century, which formed Silver Lake.  The mill was replaced in the 19th century.

References

Bodies of water in Kent County, Delaware
Bodies of water in Sussex County, Delaware
Ponds of Delaware
Milford, Delaware